The Red Cross Society of Benin, also known as RCB, was founded in 1963. It has its headquarters in Porto Novo, Benin.

External links
IFRC Red Crescent Society of Benin Profile

Benin
1963 establishments in the Republic of Dahomey
Organizations established in 1963
Porto-Novo
Medical and health organisations based in Benin